Cuscuta californica is a species of dodder known by the common names chaparral dodder and California dodder. This is an annual parasitic plant that may resemble fine strands of spaghetti or twine strewn across other species in its habitat. A mature plant of this species may fulfill all of its food and water needs from the host plant, but they rarely kill their host. It is native to western United States and Baja California in Mexico.

Description
Cuscuta californica is a parasitic vine which climbs other plants and takes nutrition directly from them via a haustorium. The dodder resembles a pile of yellow-orange straw wrapped tightly around its host plant. It is mostly stem; the leaves are reduced to scales on the stem's surface, since they are not needed for photosynthesis while the dodder is obtaining nutrients from its host. 

It bears tiny white flowers which are only about 3 millimeters wide, and fruits which are even smaller. The corolla lobes are also equaling or longer than the corolla tube, and the filaments are 0.6 to 1.1 mm long.

Phenology 
Although this species spends most of its life without any contact with the soil, it is borne from a normal, rooted seed. The seed contains minimal energy reserves, meaning seedlings must locate and parasitize a host within a matter of days. It accomplishes this by means of "foraging" patterns, as dodder seedlings can detect the volatile compounds emitted by host plants. Dodder seedlings are even capable of "selecting" host plants based on their compounds emitted. After it attaches itself to the host, the grounded root dies and the plant becomes completely dependent on the host for nutrition. This species flowers from March to September.

Taxonomy 
There are three recognized varieties of this species:

 Cuscuta california var. apiculata – This variety has a ovoid to conic shaped ovary and fruit, with a pointed tip, and one seed.
 Cuscuta californica var. californica – This variety has a spheric to spheric-depressed shaped ovary and fruit, with 2 to 4 seeds, and does not have a papillate perianth or pedicels.
 Cuscuta california var. papillosa – This variety has a spheric to spheric-depressed shaped ovary and fruit, with 2 to 4 seeds, and does have a densely papillate perianth and pedicels.

Distribution and habitat
This species is found throughout the western United States and parts of Mexico. In the United States, it is found in Arizona, California, Nevada, Oregon, Utah and Washington. In Mexico, it is primarily found in the northwestern portion of the state of Baja California.  It grows on numerous herbs and shrubs from various habitats, including sandy desert areas, chaparral, coastal sage scrub, grasslands, forests of Pinus ponderosa, and can be found in weedy, partially disturbed areas like roadsides. Like most other dodders, this species is considered a noxious weed in many areas. It was also discovered in Flowood, Mississippi on August 12, 2022.

References

External links

Jepson Manual Treatment
Photo gallery

californica
Parasitic plants
Flora of the Western United States
Flora of California
Flora of the Sierra Nevada (United States)
Natural history of the California chaparral and woodlands
Natural history of the California Coast Ranges
Natural history of the Channel Islands of California
Natural history of the Peninsular Ranges
Natural history of the San Francisco Bay Area
Natural history of the Santa Monica Mountains
Natural history of the Transverse Ranges
Flora of Baja California
Flora without expected TNC conservation status